Bob Taylor (31 August 1924 – 27 September 2015) was a Scotland international rugby union footballer. Taylor played as a Flanker.

Rugby career

Amateur career

Taylor played for Kelvinside-West. When the merged team decoupled in 1951, Taylor went on to support West of Scotland.

Provincial career

Taylor played for Glasgow District against Edinburgh District in the 1948-49 season's Inter-City match.

Glasgow won the Inter-City match 9 - 3. The Glasgow Herald noted that Glasgow had several chances and could have doubled their score; one of them being Taylor's knock on which should instead have led to a try.

International career

He was capped for  4 times in 1951, playing in 3 Five Nations matches. He made his international debut against Wales playing in front of a then record crowd of 80 000  at Murrayfield Stadium.

Outside of rugby

Taylor became an anaesthetist and worked at the Victoria Infirmary in Glasgow.

References

1924 births
2015 deaths
People educated at Glenalmond College
Alumni of the University of Glasgow
Scottish rugby union players
Scotland international rugby union players
Glasgow District (rugby union) players
Kelvinside-West players
Rugby union flankers
Scottish anaesthetists
Rugby union players from Glasgow